Gustav von Bergmann (24 December 1878 – 16 September 1955) was a German internist born in Würzburg. He was the son of renowned surgeon Ernst von Bergmann (1836–1907).

Education 
In 1903 he received his doctorate at Strasbourg, and afterwards worked at the second medical hospital in Berlin under Friedrich Kraus. In 1916 he became a full professor of internal medicine in Marburg, and later a professor at Frankfurt am Main (from 1920), the Berlin Charité (from 1927) and Munich (from 1946).

Career 
He was a proponent of "functional pathology", and is considered to be one of the founders of psychosomatic medicine. His research involved investigations into gastro-intestinal ulcers, hypertension and studies of the autonomic nervous system. From 1994 to 2010, the Gustav-von-Bergmann-Medaille was the highest honor awarded by the German Society of Internal Medicine.

With Albrecht Bethe and Gustav Georg Embden, he was co-publisher of the multi-volume Handbuch der normalen und pathologischen Physiologie. With Rudolf Stähelin, he published the second edition of Handbuch der inneren Medizin. Other noted works of his include:
 Das vegetative Nervensystem und seine Störungen (The autonomic nervous system and its disorders). 1926.
 Funktionelle Pathologie (Functional pathology), 1932.
 Neues Denken in der Medizin (New reasoning in medicine), 1947.

He attended to physiologist Emil von Behring during the night prior to Behring's death of a pulmonary inflammation on March 31, 1917.

References

1878 births
1955 deaths
German internists
Physicians from Würzburg
People from the Kingdom of Bavaria
Academic staff of the Humboldt University of Berlin
Academic staff of the University of Marburg
Academic staff of Goethe University Frankfurt
Academic staff of the Ludwig Maximilian University of Munich
Members of the German Academy of Sciences at Berlin
Physicians of the Charité